The 1985 German Grand Prix was a Formula One motor race held at Nürburgring on 4 August 1985. It was the ninth race of the 1985 Formula One season.

This was the first German Grand Prix that was held on the new GP-Strecke section of the track that replaced the old Südschleife section that had not been used since 1970. It was also the first time in nine years the German GP was held at Nürburgring; previously the German Grand Prix had been held on the Nordschleife configuration until 1976, after which the Grand Prix was moved to the Hockenheimring, following Niki Lauda's near-fatal accident at the 1976 German Grand Prix. The GP-Strecke would not host another Grand Prix until the 1995 European Grand Prix, and would not host the German Grand Prix again until the 2009 edition.

Michele Alboreto won the race, his fifth and last Formula One victory. This event was the first occasion on which an onboard camera was used in a race; on François Hesnault's Renault car. That car was not eligible for championship points, and this race marked the last time that an F1 team entered more than two cars for a race.

As it was the German Grand Prix (and that the team still only had 1 new car built) Tyrrell team boss Ken Tyrrell gave his German driver Stefan Bellof use of the Renault powered Tyrrell 014 for the weekend instead of the car's usual driver Martin Brundle, who was given Bellof's Cosworth powered 012 to drive. To get around a FISA rule stating that a team and driver could not run more than 2 engines in the one chassis during a season (with the 012 running the Cosworth and 014 the Renault), Tyrrell simply switched the drivers from one car to the other but not their car numbers, meaning Bellof drove in car #3 and Brundle in car #4. Bellof qualified the turbo powered car 19th while Brundle was 26th and last with the Cosworth V8, some 10.2 seconds of Fabi's pole time and 6.4 seconds slower than his teammate in his usual car, something Brundle was reported to be not happy with. This was to be the last Grand Prix for Manfred Winkelhock: the German fatally crashed his Porsche 962C sportscar at the 1000 km of Mosport in Canada the following week.

Classification

Qualifying
Pole position went to Teo Fabi, the first of his career and the only pole for the Toleman team. He set his pole time during the Friday qualifying session; rain on Saturday meant that none of the drivers could improve their times.

Race

Championship standings after the race

Drivers' Championship standings

Constructors' Championship standings

Note: Only the top five positions are included for both sets of standings.

References

German Grand Prix
German Grand Prix
German Grand Prix
Sport in Rhineland-Palatinate
German Grand Prix